Radiation damping in accelerator physics is a way of reducing the beam emittance of a high-velocity charged particle beam by synchrotron radiation.

The two main ways of using radiation damping to reduce the emittance of a particle beam are the use of undulators and damping rings (often containing undulators), both relying on the same principle of inducing synchrotron radiation to reduce the particles' momentum, then replacing the momentum only in the desired direction of motion.

Damping rings
As particles are moving in a closed orbit, the lateral acceleration causes them to emit synchrotron radiation, thereby reducing the size of their momentum vectors (relative to the design orbit) without changing their orientation (ignoring quantum effects for the moment). In longitudinal direction, the loss of particle impulse due to radiation is replaced by accelerating sections (RF cavities) that are installed in the beam path so that an equilibrium is reached at the design energy of the accelerator. Since this is not happening in transverse direction, where the emittance of the beam is only increased by the quantization of radiation losses (quantum effects), the transverse equilibrium emittance of the particle beam will be smaller with large radiation losses, compared to small radiation losses.

Because high orbit curvatures (low curvature radii) increase the emission of synchrotron radiation, damping rings are often small. If long beams with many particle bunches are needed to fill a larger storage ring, the damping ring may be extended with long straight sections.

Undulators and wigglers
When faster damping is required than can be provided by the turns inherent in a damping ring, it is common to add undulator or wiggler magnets to induce more synchrotron radiation.  These are devices with periodic magnetic fields that cause the particles to oscillate transversely, equivalent to many small tight turns.  These operate using the same principle as damping rings and this oscillation causes the charged particles to emit synchrotron radiation.

The many small turns in an undulator have the advantage that the cone of synchrotron radiation is all in one direction, forward.  This is easier to shield than the broad fan produced by a large turn.

See also 

 Particle beam cooling

External links
 SLAC damping rings home page, including a non-technical description of the damping rings at SLAC.
 Studies Pertaining to a Small Damping Ring for the International Linear Collider, a report describing the constraints on minimum damping ring size.

Accelerator physics
Synchrotron radiation